SM U-30 or U-XXX was a U-27 class U-boat or submarine of the Austro-Hungarian Navy. U-30, built by the Hungarian firm of Ganz Danubius at Fiume, was launched in December 1916 and commissioned in February 1917.

She displaced nearly  when surfaced and over  when submerged. She was armed with two bow torpedo tubes and could carry a load of up to four torpedoes. She was also equipped with a  deck gun and a machine gun.

U-30 sank no ships during her brief service career. She departed from Cattaro on 31 March 1917 and was never heard from again. She may have succumbed to a mine in the Otranto Barrage but her fate remains a mystery.

Design and construction 

After these steps alleviated their most urgent needs, the Austro-Hungarian Navy selected the German Type UB II design for its newest submarines in mid 1915. The Germans were reluctant to allocate any of their wartime resources to Austro-Hungarian construction, but were willing to sell plans for up to six of the UB II boats to be constructed under license in Austria-Hungary. The Navy agreed to the proposal and purchased the plans from AG Weser of Bremen.

U-30 displaced  surfaced and  submerged. She was capable of  while surfaced and  while submerged. U-27-class boats were designed for a crew of 23–24.

U-30 was armed with two  bow torpedo tubes and could carry a complement of four torpedoes. She was also equipped with a 75 mm/26 (3.0 in) deck gun and an  machine gun.

After intricate political negotiations to allocate production of the class between Austrian and Hungarian firms, U-27 was ordered from Ganz Danubius on 12 October 1915. She was laid down on 9 March 1916 at Fiume and launched on 27 December.

Service career 
U-30 began diving trials on 8 January 1917, and made her first underwater cruise on 27 January. Four days later she took on a crew for a training voyage, and made her way to Pola. At that port, on 21 January 1917, SM U-30 was commissioned into the Austro-Hungarian Navy under the command of Linienschiffsleutnant Friedrich Fähndrich.

U-30 departed on her first patrol on 26 February, for duty off Cape Matapan and the Gulf of Taranto. During the patrol, U-30 did not encounter any hostile ships, but did encounter a storm that caused extensive damage. Cutting short her cruise with damage to the parapet on her conning tower, a missing radio aerial, and a broken gyrocompass, U-30 arrived in Cattaro on 16 March for repairs.

With the repairs complete, U-30 set out from Cattaro on 31 March and was never heard from again. Author Paul Halpern suggests that a mine in the Otranto Barrage might have been responsible. Authors R. H. Gibson and Maurice Prendergast report that there is no evidence in Allied records to indicate the possible fate of the U-boat, and conclude that the fate of U-30 remains a mystery, and "is likely to remain so for ever". U-30 was not credited with the sinking of any ships in her brief career. She was also the only member of the U-27-class to be lost during the war.

Notes

References

Bibliography 
 
 
 

 
 

U-27-class submarines (Austria-Hungary)
U-boats commissioned in 1917
World War I shipwrecks in the Adriatic Sea
1916 ships
World War I submarines of Austria-Hungary
Ships built in Fiume